Moosilauke Brook is a  stream in the White Mountains of New Hampshire in the United States. It is the downstream continuation of the Lost River and is a tributary of the Pemigewasset River, part of the Merrimack River watershed.

Moosilauke Brook begins in the eastern part of Kinsman Notch, where the Lost River, flowing out of the center of the notch, joins Jackman Brook entering from the south. Moosilauke Brook runs northeast, passing through the granite gorge of Agassiz Basin and joining the Pemigewasset River in the village of North Woodstock.

New Hampshire Route 112 follows Moosilauke Brook for its entire course.

See also

List of rivers of New Hampshire

References

Tributaries of the Merrimack River
Rivers of New Hampshire
Rivers of Grafton County, New Hampshire
New Hampshire placenames of Native American origin